Athy was a constituency represented in the Irish House of Commons until its abolition on 1 January 1801. Following the Act of Union 1800 the borough was disenfranchised.

History
In the Patriot Parliament of 1689 summoned by James II, Athy was represented with two members.

Members of Parliament, 1560–1801

Notes

References

Bibliography

 Johnston-Liik, E. M. (2002). History of the Irish Parliament, 1692–1800, Publisher: Ulster Historical Foundation (28 Feb 2002),  
 T. W. Moody, F. X. Martin, F. J. Byrne, A New History of Ireland 1534–1691, Oxford University Press, 1978

Constituencies of the Parliament of Ireland (pre-1801)
Historic constituencies in County Kildare
Athy
1614 establishments in Ireland
1800 disestablishments in Ireland
Constituencies established in 1614
Constituencies disestablished in 1800